A daeva (Avestan: 𐬛𐬀𐬉𐬎𐬎𐬀 daēuua) is a Zoroastrian supernatural entity with disagreeable characteristics. In the Gathas, the oldest texts of the Zoroastrian canon, the daevas are "gods that are (to be) rejected". This meaning is – subject to interpretation – perhaps also evident in the Old Persian "daiva inscription" of the 5th century BCE. In the Younger Avesta, the daevas are divinities that promote chaos and disorder. In later tradition and folklore, the dēws (Zoroastrian Middle Persian; New Persian divs) are personifications of every imaginable evil. Over time, the Daeva myth as Div became integrated to Islam.

Daeva, the Iranian language term, shares the same origin of "Deva" of Hinduism. While the word for the Vedic spirits and the word for the Zoroastrian entities are etymologically related, their function and thematic development is altogether different. Originally, the term was used to denote beings of cultural folklore which predate use in scripture.

Equivalents for Avestan daeva in Iranian languages include Pashto, Balochi, Kurdish dêw, Persian dīv/deev, all of which apply to ogres, monsters, and other villainous creatures. The Iranian word was borrowed into Old Armenian as dew, Georgian as devi, Urdu as deo, and Turkish as dev  with the same negative associations in those languages. In English, the word appears as daeva, div, deev, and in the 18th century fantasy novels of William Thomas Beckford as dive.

It has been speculated that the concept of the daevas as a malevolent force may have been inspired from the Scythian gods.

Academic issues

Problems of interpretation
Old Avestan daēuua or daēva derives from Old Iranian *daiva, which in turn derives from Indo-Iranian *daivá- "god", reflecting Proto-Indo-European *deywós with the same meaning. For other Indo-European derivatives, see Dyeus. The Vedic Sanskrit cognate of Avestan daēuua is devá-, continuing in later Indo-Aryan languages as dev.

Because all cognates of Iranian *daiva have a positive connotation, but "no known Iranian dialect attests clearly and certainly the survival of a positive sense for [Old Iranian] *daiva-", in the 19th- and 20th-century a great deal of academic discussion revolved around questions of how Iranian daeva might have gained its derogatory meaning. This "fundamental fact of Iranian linguistics" is "impossible" to reconcile with the testimony of the Gathas, where the daevas, though rejected, were still evidently gods that continued to have a following. The same is true of the daiva inscription, where the daiva are the gods of (potential) rebels, but still evidently gods that continued to have a following.

The issue is related to the question of how Zoroaster's own contribution to Iranian religion might be defined. In the older early/mid 20th-century view (so-called reform hypothesis), in which Zoroaster was perceived to be a revolutionary reformer, it was assumed that the daevas must have been the "national" gods (see comparison with Indic usage, below) of pre-Zoroaster-ian Iran, which Zoroaster had then rejected. This attribution to Zoroaster is also found in the 9th/10th-century books of Zoroastrian tradition, and Gershevitch and others following Lommel consider the progression from "national" gods to demons to be attributable to the "genius of Zoroaster". Subsequent scholarship (so-called progressive hypothesis) has a more differentiated view of Zoroaster, and does not follow the unprovable assumption that prehistoric Iranian religion ever had "national" gods (and thus also that the daevas could have represented such a group), nor does it involve hypothetical conjecture of whose gods the daevas might/might not have been. While the progressive hypothesis gives Zoroaster credit for giving Iranian religion a moral and ethical dimension, it does not (with one notable exception) give Zoroaster credit for the development of the daevas into demons. It assumes that the development was gradual, and that a general distrust of the daevas already existed by the time the Gathas were composed.

In comparison with Vedic usage
Although with some points of comparison such as shared etymology, Indic devá- is thematically different from Avestan daēva.

While in the post-Rigvedic Indic texts the conflict between the two groups of devas and asuras is a primary theme, this is not a theme in either the Rigveda nor in the Iranian texts,

and therefore cannot have been a feature of a common heritage. The use of asura in the Rigveda is unsystematic and inconsistent and "it can hardly be said to confirm the existence of a category of gods opposed to the devas". Indeed, RigVedic deva is variously applied to most gods, including many of the asuras.  Likewise, at the oldest layer, Zoroastrianism's daevas are originally also gods (albeit gods to be rejected), and it is only in the younger texts that the word evolved to refer to evil creatures. And the Zoroastrian ahuras (etymologically related to the Vedic asuras) are also only vaguely defined, and only three in number.

Moreover, the daemonization of the asuras in India and the daemonization of the daevas in Iran both took place "so late that the associated terms cannot be considered a feature of Indo-Iranian religious dialectology". The view popularized by Nyberg, Jacques Duchesne-Guillemin, and Widengren of a prehistorical opposition of *asura/daiva involves "interminable and entirely conjectural discussions" on the status of various Indo-Iranian entities that in one culture are asuras/ahuras and in the other are devas/daevas (see examples in the Younger Avesta, below).

In scripture

In Zoroaster's revelation
In the Gathas, the oldest texts of Zoroastrianism and credited to Zoroaster himself, the daevas are not yet the demons that they would become in later Zoroastrianism; though their rejection is notable in the Gathas themselves. The Gathas speak of the daevas as a group, and do not mention individual daevas by name. In these ancient texts, the term daevas (also spelled 'daēuuas') occurs 19 times; wherein daevas are a distinct category of "quite genuine gods, who had, however, been rejected". In Yasna 32.3 and 46.1, the daevas are still worshipped by the Iranian peoples. Yasna 32.8 notes that some of the followers of Zoroaster had previously been followers of the daevas; though, the daevas are clearly identified with evil (e.g., Yasna 32.5).

In the Gathas, daevas are censured as being incapable of discerning truth (asha-) from falsehood (druj-). They are consequently in "error" (aēnah-), but are never identified as drəguuaṇt- "people of the lie". The conclusion drawn from such ambiguity is that, at the time the Gathas were composed, "the process of rejection, negation, or daemonization of these gods was only just beginning, but, as the evidence is full of gaps and ambiguities, this impression may be erroneous". 

In Yasna 32.4, the daevas are revered by the Usij, described as a class of "false priests", devoid of goodness of mind and heart, and hostile to cattle and husbandry (Yasna 32.10–11, 44.20). Like the daevas that they follow, "the Usij are known throughout the seventh region of the earth as the offspring of aka mainyu, druj, and arrogance. (Yasna 32.3)". Yasna 30.6 suggests the daeva-worshipping priests debated frequently with Zoroaster, but failed to persuade him.

In the Younger Avesta
In the Younger Avesta, the daevas are unambiguously hostile entities. In contrast, the word daevayasna- (literally, "one who sacrifices to daevas") denotes adherents of other religions and thus still preserves some semblance of the original meaning in that the daeva- prefix still denotes "other" gods. In Yasht 5.94 however, the daevayasna- are those who sacrifice to Anahita during the hours of darkness, i.e., the hours when the daevas lurk about, and daevayasna- appears then to be an epithet applied to those who deviate from accepted practice and/or harvested religious disapproval.

The Vendidad, a contraction of vi-daevo-dāta, "given against the daevas", is a collection of late Avestan texts that deals almost exclusively with the daevas, or rather, their various manifestations and with ways to confound them. Vi.daeva- "rejecting the daevas" qualifies the faithful Zoroastrian with the same force as mazdayasna- ('Mazda worshiper').

In Vendidad 10.9 and 19.43, three divinities of the Vedic pantheon follow Angra Mainyu in a list of demons: Completely adapted to Iranian phonology, these are Indra (Vedic Indra), Sarva (Vedic Sarva, i.e. Rudra), and Nanghaithya (Vedic Nasatya). The process by which these three came to appear in the Avesta is uncertain. Together with three other daevas, Tauru, Zairi and Nasu, that do not have Vedic equivalents, the six oppose the six Amesha Spentas.

Vendidad 19.1 and 19.44 have Angra Mainyu dwelling in the region of the daevas which the Vendidad sets in the north and/or the nether world (Vendidad  19.47, Yasht 15.43), a world of darkness. In Vendidad 19.1 and 19.43–44, Angra Mainyu is the daevanam daevo, "daeva of daevas" or chief of the daevas. The superlative daevo.taema is however assigned to the demon Paitisha ("opponent"). In an enumeration of the daevas in Vendidad 1.43, Angra Mainyu appears first and Paitisha appears last. "Nowhere is Angra Mainyu said to be the creator of the daevas or their father."

The Vendidad is usually recited after nightfall since the last part of the day is considered to be the time of the demons. Because the Vendidad is the means to disable them, this text is said to be effective only when recited between sunset and sunrise.

In inscriptions
Old Persian daiva occurs twice in Xerxes' daiva inscription (XPh, early 5th century BCE). This trilingual text also includes one reference to a daivadana "house of the daivas", generally interpreted to be a reference to a shrine or sanctuary.

In his inscription, Xerxes records that "by the favour of Ahura Mazda I destroyed that establishment of the daivas and I proclaimed, 'The daivas thou shalt not worship!'" This statement has been interpreted either one of two ways. Either the statement is an ideological one and daivas were gods that were to be rejected, or the statement was politically motivated and daivas were gods that were followed by (potential) enemies of the state.

In tradition and folklore

In Zoroastrian tradition
In the Middle Persian texts of Zoroastrian tradition, the dews are invariably rendered with the Aramaic ideogram ŠDYA or the more common plural ŠDYAʼn that signified "demons" even in the singular.

Dews play a crucial role in the cosmogonic drama of the Bundahishn, a Zoroastrian view of creation completed in the 12th century. In this text, the evil spirit Ahriman (the middle Persian equivalent of Avestan Angra Mainyu) creates his hordes of dews to counter the creation of Ormuzd (Avestan Ahura Mazda). This notion is already alluded to in the Vendidad (see Younger Avestan texts above), but only properly developed in the Bundahishn. In particular, Ahriman is seen to create six dews that in Zoroastrian tradition are the antitheses of the Amahraspands (Avestan Amesha Spentas).

Mirroring the task of the Amesha Spentas through which Ahura Mazda realized creation, the six antitheses are the instrument through which Angra Mainyu creates all the horrors in the world. Further, the arch-daevas of Vendidad 10.9 and 19.43 are identified as the antithetical counterparts of the Amesha Spentas. The six arch-demons as listed in the Epistles of Zadspram (WZ 35.37) and the Greater Bundahishn (GBd. 34.27) are:
 Akoman of "evil thought" opposing Wahman/Bahman of "good thought" (Av. Aka Manah versus Vohu Manah)
 Indar that freezes the minds of the righteous opposing Ardawahisht of "best truth" (Av. Indar versus Asha Vahishta).
 Nanghait of discontent opposing Spendarmad of "holy devotion" (Av. Naonhaithya/Naonghaithya versus Spenta Armaiti)
 Sawar/Sarvar of oppression opposing Shahrewar of "desirable dominion" (Av. Saurva versus Kshathra Vairya)
 Tauriz/Tawrich of destruction opposing Hordad of "wholeness" (Av. Taurvi versus Haurvatat)
 Zariz/Zarich who poisons plants opposing Amurdad of "immortality" (Av. Zauri versus Ameretat)
These oppositions differ from those found in scripture, where the moral principles (that each Amesha Spenta represents) are opposed by immoral principles. This is not however a complete breach, for while in the Gathas asha—the principle—is the diametric opposite of the abstract druj, in Zoroastrian tradition, it is Ardawahisht, the Amesha Spenta that is the hypostasis of asha, that is opposed to by Indar, who freezes the minds of creatures from practicing "righteousness" (asha).
Greater Bundahishn 34.27 adds two more arch-demons, which are not however in opposition to Amesha Spentas:
 Xeshm of "wrath" opposing Srosh of "obedience" (Av. Aeshma versus Sraosha)
 Gannag menog, the "foul death" or "stinking spirit", opposing Hormazd (Gannag menog is unknown in the Avesta, and Hormazd is Ahura Mazda).

Also mirroring Ormuzd's act of creation, i.e., the realization of the Amesha Spentas by his "thought", is Ahriman's creation of the dews through his "demonic essence". Other texts describe this event as being to Ahriman's detriment for his act of "creation" is actually an act of destruction. Ahriman is the very epitome (and hypostasis) of destruction, and hence he did not "create" the demons, he realized them through destruction, and they then became that destruction. The consequence is that, as Ahriman and the dews can only destruct, they will ultimately destroy themselves (Denkard 3). As the medieval texts also do for Ahriman, they question whether the dews exist at all. Since "existence" is the domain of Ormuzd, and Ahriman and his dews are anti-existence, it followed that Ahriman and his dews could not possibly exist. One interpretation of the Denkard proposes that the dews were perceived to be non-existent physically (that is, they were considered non-ontological) but present psychologically. (see also: Ahriman: In Zoroastrian tradition)

For a different set of texts, such as the Shayest ne shayest and the Book of Arda Wiraz, Ahriman and the dews were utterly real, and are described as being potentially catastrophic. In such less philosophical representations, the dews are hordes of devils with a range of individual powers ranging from the almost benign to the most malign. They collectively rush out at nightfall to do their worst, which includes every possible form of corruption at every possible level of human existence. Their destructiveness is evident not only in disease, pain, and grief but also in cosmic events such as falling stars and climatic events such as droughts, cyclones and earthquakes. They are sometimes described as having anthropomorphic properties such as faces and feet, or given animal-like properties such as claws and body hair. They may produce semen, and may even mate with humans as in the tale of Jam and Jamag (Bundahishn 14B.1).

But with the exception of the Book of Arda Wiraz, the dews are not generally described as a force to be feared. With fundamental optimism, the texts describe how the dews may be kept in check, ranging from cursing them to the active participation in life through good thoughts, words and deeds. Many of the medieval texts develop ideas already expressed in the Vendidad ("given against the demons").

A fire (cf. Adur) is an effective weapon against the dews, and keeping a hearth fire burning is a means to protect the home. The dews are "particularly attracted by the organic productions of human beings, from excretion, reproduction, sex, and death". Prayer and other recitations of the liturgy, in particular the recitation of Yasht 1 (so Sad-dar 57), is effective in keeping the demons at bay. Demons are attracted by chatter at mealtimes and when silence is broken a demon takes the place of the angel at one's side. According to Shayest-ne-Shayest 9.8, eating at all after nightfall is not advisable since the night is the time of demons. In the 9th century rivayats (65.14), the demons are described as issuing out at night to wreak mayhem, but forced back into the underworld by the divine glory (khvarenah) at sunrise.

The Zoroastrianism of the medieval texts is unambiguous with respect to which force is the superior. Evil cannot create and is hence has a lower priority in the cosmic order (asha). According to Denkard 5.24.21a, the protection of the yazatas is ultimately greater than the power of the demons. The dews are agents ("procurers—vashikano—of success") of Ahriman (Avestan Angra Mainyu) in the contests that will continue until the end of time, at which time the fiend will become invisible and (God's) creatures will become pure. (Dadestan-i Denig 59)

But until the final renovation of the world, mankind "stands between the yazads and the dēws; the [yazads] are immortal in essence and inseparable from their bodies (mēnōg), men are immortal in essence but separable from their bodies (moving from gētīg to mēnōg condition), but dēws are mortal in essence and inseparable from their bodies, which may be destroyed."

In addition to the six arch-demons (see above) that oppose the six Amesha Spentas, numerous other figures appear in scripture and tradition. According to Bundahishn XXVII.12, the six arch-demons have cooperators (hamkars), arranged in a hierarchy (not further specified) similar to that of the yazatas. These are "dews [...] created by the sins that creatures commit." (Bundahishn XXVII.51)
 Akatash of perversion (e.g., Gbd XXVII)
 Anashtih "strife" (e.g., Chidag Andarz i Poryotkeshan 38)
 Anast that utters falsehood (e.g., Gbd XXVII)
 Apaush and Spenjaghra who cause drought (e.g., Gbd XXVII)
 Araska of vengeance (e.g., Gbd XXVII)
 Ashmogh of apostasy (Avestan Ashemaogha)
 Az of avarice and greed (e.g., Gbd XXVII)
 Buht of idolatry (e.g., Gbd XXVII)
 Bushasp of sloth (Avestan Bushyasta) (e.g., Gbd XXVII)
 Diwzhat (Av. Daebaaman), the deceiver, the hypocrite
 Eshm of wrath (Avestan Aeshma) (e.g., Gbd XXVII)
 Freptar of distraction and deception (e.g., Gbd XXVII)
 Jeh the whore (Avestan Jahi) (e.g., Gbd III)
 Mitokht (also Mithaokhta) of scepticism and falsehood (e.g. Gbd XXVII)
 Nang of disgrace and dishonor (e.g., Dadestan-i Denig 53)
 Nas or Nasa (Avestan Nasu) of pollution and contamination (e.g., GBd XXVII)
 Niyaz causes want (e.g., Gbd XXVII)
 Pinih of stinginess and who hoards but does not enjoy its hoard (e.g., Gbd XXVII)
 Rashk (Avestan Areshko) "envy" (e.g. Denkard 9.30.4)
 Sij who causes destruction (e.g., Gbd XXVII)
 Sitoj that denies doctrine (e.g., Dadestan-i Denig 53)
 Spazg of slander (e.g., Gbd XXVII)
 Spuzgar, the negligent (e.g., Andarz-i Khosru-i-Kavatan)
 Taromaiti of scorn (e.g., Gbd XXVII)
 Varun of unnatural lust (e.g., Gbd XXVII)
Other entities include:
 Aghash of the evil eye (e.g., Gbd XXVII)
 Astwihad of death (Avestan Asto-widhatu or Asto-vidatu) (e.g., Gbd XXVII)
 [Azi-/Az-]Dahak (Avestan Azi Dahaka), a serpent-like monster king. (e.g., J 4)
 Cheshma who opposes the clouds and causes earthquakes and whirlwinds (e.g., Gbd XXVII)
 Kunda, the steed that carries sorcerers (e.g., Gbd XXVII)
 Uta who brings about sickness through food and water (e.g., Gbd XXVII)
 Vizaresh that fights for the souls of the dead (e.g., Gbd XXVII)
The most destructive of these are Astiwihad, the demon of death that casts the noose of mortality around men's necks at birth, and Az, who is most capable of destroying the "innate wisdom" of man. Az is thus the cause of heresy and blinds the righteous man from being able to discern the truth and falsehood.

In the Shahnameh

A list of ten demons is provided in the Shahnameh: Besides the afore-mentioned Az "greed", Kashm "wrath" (Avestan Aeshma), Nang "dishonor", Niaz "want", and Rashk "envy", the epic poem includes Kin "vengeance", Nammam "tell-tale", Do-ruy "two-face", napak-din "heresy", and (not explicitly named) ungratefulness.

Some of the entities that in the Middle Persian texts are demons, are in the Shahnameh attributes of demons, for instance, varuna "backwards" or "inside out", reflecting that they tend to do the opposite of what they are asked to do. Although Ferdowsi generally portrays divs as being distinct from humans, the poet also uses the word to denote "evil people".

One of the more popular stories from the Shahnameh is that of Rostam and the Dīv-e Sapīd, the "white demon" of Mazandaran, who blinds Rostam's men (who are then cured with the blood of the demon's gall).

References

Bibliography

 
 .
 .
 
 .
 .
 .
 .
 .

 
 .
 .
 .
 .
 .
 
 .
 .

Further reading
 Ahmadi, Amir. "Two Chthonic Features of the Daēva Cult in Historical Evidence." History of Religions 54, no. 3 (2015): 346–70. doi:10.1086/679000.

External links

 
Ancient Iranian deities
Demons in the ancient Near East
Persian legendary creatures
Azerbaijani mythology
Kurdish mythology
Shahnameh characters
Supernatural legends